George Wilson Chaharbakhshi (born 1952 in Tehran) is an Assyrian singer active in the United States. His 70s and 80s songs usually incorporated Latin instrumentation and rhythm.

Biography 

George Chaharbakhshi was born in Tehran, Iran in 1952 to an Assyrian father, Wilson Chaharbakhshi, and a Greek mother, Helen Chaharbakhshi.
After finishing high school in Iran he continued his studies at the University of Illinois, Chicago. It was during his college years that he formed his own band which gained popularity among the Assyrian community in the United States.
His popularity grew after releasing his first album in the 1970s and he has performed in several countries for the Assyrian diaspora.

References

 Music pearls of Beth-Nahrin: an Assyrian/Syriac discography, Abboud Zeitoune

Assyrian musicians
Syriac-language singers
20th-century Iranian male singers
Singers from Tehran
Iranian Assyrian people
Iranian people of Greek descent
Iranian emigrants to the United States
Living people
1952 births